Kaffrine Region is a region of Senegal. It was created in 2008.

Departments
Kaffrine Region has four departments:
Birkilane Département
Kaffrine Département
Koungheul Département
Malem Hoddar Département

 
States and territories established in 2008
Regions of Senegal